João Ricardo Azevedo Colaço mostly known for his stage name Plutónio (born 28 August 1985) is a Portuguese rapper and hip-hop singer.

Discography

Albums

Singles

As lead artist

As featured artist

Awards

See also 

 List of number-one singles of 2018 (Portugal)

References 

Álbum de músico moçambicano atinge o galardão de Platina Moz massoko Music (in Portuguese). Retrieved 2020-06-24

Living people
1985 births
Portuguese rappers
21st-century Portuguese male singers
Portuguese people of Mozambican descent
People from Cascais